MIR-2 (Russian:МИР-2) is the version of the МИР-1 computer developed by the Institute of Cybernetics of the Academy of Sciences of Ukrainian SSR. under the guidance of Academician VM Glushkov. Produced since 1969.

Overview
The speed of the МИР-2 machine is about 12,000 op / s. The capacity of the random access memory (12-μs circulation cycle) is 8,000 13-bit symbols. The read-only memory has a capacity of about 1.6 million bits with a cycle of 4 μs, which is enough to store several tens of thousands of micro-commands. There is a buffer memory for output information with a volume of 4000 10-bit words. As external devices were used: input from punched tape, output to punched tape, electric typewriter Soemtron, magnetic card drive, vector graphic display with light pen.

As the input language in the МИР-2 machine, a special high-level language Аналитик was used, which developed the concepts of the МИР-1 built-in programming language and additionally allowed the formulation of tasks with analytic transformations of formulas, allowing analytical expressions for derivatives and integrals.

Soviet computer systems